The DB Class 670 (Baureihe 670) is a double-decker diesel railbus. It was created on request of the Deutsche Bahn by the Dessau and Halle-Ammendorf factories of the Deutsche Waggonbau AG (DWA) It has two axles and the construction re-used motorbus components.

Development 

The underframe is made from light weight steel construction, while the outer shell consists of glued on galvanized panels. The cab ends are made of glass-fibre laminate. Both sides have a double folding-sliding door. Spiral staircases give access to the upper level on the inside.

The first prototype was presented to the public in autumn 1994 and shown at the Innotrans trade fair in October 1996. This "Demonstrator" was painted completely in red and was numbered as "670 000". Unlike the six cars made in the series production, the prototype was never licensed for passenger transportation.

History 
Series production was six units, which were used starting 1996 on lines in Thuringia, Saxony-Anhalt and Rhineland-Palatinate. During use problems with air conditioning and engine cooling were observed, and the lack of toilets proved problematic. The six series cars initially were coloured white with a red stripe, similar to the Intercity Express. Later the color scheme was changed to "Verkehrsrot" (RAL 3020) with a white stripe. A seventh car was started but never finished and scrapped at the factory. The follow up series 670.1 was never built, due to the many problems of the first series and misunderstandings between the manufacturer and Deutsche Bahn.

The six cars were used on the lines Weimar–Kranichfeld, the Moselweinbahn, and the line Trier-Perl, later also on the line Stendal-Tangermünde.

Starting June 1996, Cars 670 002 and 005 were moved to the Bullay–Traben-Trarbach line. While popular with the tourist travellers on the line, they were taken out of service due unreliability, being especially prone to hot boxes. The service on the Upper Mosel line  Trier-Perl starting in September 1996 was also unsuccessful, as the cars were too small for the transport of school pupils and did not have onboard toilets.

Service in Thuringia also was shut down soon. At the line Stendal-Tangermünde car 670 002 was used till March 2003, which was the only long term successful service of the class 670. The class 670 was followed by the much older DMUs of the Class 771/772.

Most class 670 cars of Deutsche Bahn were handed back to the manufacturer in 2001, which was merged with Bombardier Transportation since 1998. The manufacturer refurbished the cars and sold them again.

Three cars were sold to the Dessau-Wörlitzer Railway. Car 670 002 ("Alma") was used as a parts donor, cars 005 and 006 were placed into service. One of them, 670 002, was later found belonging to the Anhaltische Bahn Gesellschaft and was auctioned on February 25, 2011.

The cars were used on the line Dessau-Wörlitz. As the cars were not usable for a longer time, the traffic on this line was shut down for about nine months and a replacement service with buses was run. Rail traffic started again at June 19, 2011 using the refurbished 670 005 "Fürst Franz". This car (005) was removed from service again in 2017 due to a broken Hydraulical System and is used as a parts donor for 670 006 "Fürstin Louise", which is supposed to get a new general inspection in 2020 and shall be used for special trains and as a backup car. Main traffic on the line will be done by class 672 cars of the Burgendlandbahn

The remaining three cars 670 001, 003 and 004 were used by the Prignitzer Eisenbahn GmbH. Cars 670 003 and 004 were later sold to the Eisenbahngesellschaft Potsdam and are used on lines in the Prignitz region since 2009

The prototype 670 000 (red "Demonstrator") was temporarily owned by the Traditionsgemeinschaft Ferkeltaxi e.V. and sold to a private owner in Oelsnitz. Car 670 002 was bought by the Traditionsgemeinschaft Ferkeltaxi e.V. as a substitute and is used for special trains.

Overview

Pictures

References

Literature 
 Jürgen Lorenz: Baureihe 670 vor der Fertigstellung. In: Eisenbahn-Kurier. Nr. 281/Jahrgang 30/1996. EK-Verlag GmbH, S. 44–45.
 Matthias Honigmann: Die Doppelstockschienenbusse der Baureihe 670 (96 Seiten). Verlag Dirk Endisch. 1. Auflage Stendal 2017.

External links 

 Images of BR 670 in the gallery of European Railway Cars
 Fahrzeuge der Traditionsgemeinschaft Ferkeltaxi e.V

Bombardier Transportation multiple units
Diesel multiple units of Germany